Grass Lake is an unincorporated community in Antioch Township, Lake County, Illinois, United States.

References

Unincorporated communities in Illinois
Chicago metropolitan area
Unincorporated communities in Lake County, Illinois